Satellite Bay is the first studio album by German post-rock band Long Distance Calling. The album was recorded April 2007 at Tonmeisterei in Oldenburg and released through Viva Hate Records on 21 September 2007.

Reception

The album received moderate to favorable reviews among metal reviewers. Alexander Eitner of Metal News gave the album a positive review saying that Long Distance Calling are able to write “captivating and varied songs” through the full playing time of the studio album. For Markus Endres from the online magazine Metal.de, Long Distance Calling "Walls down and kidnaps listeners into other spheres" for which he gave it eight out of ten points. Thomas Kohlruß of Babyblaue Seiten gave the album a moderate review describing Satellite Bay as a "great debut of a truly outstanding instrumental band".

Track listing

Personnel

Long Distance Calling
 Florian Funtmann - guitar
 David Jordan - guitar
 Jan Joffmann - bass
 Janosch Rathmer - drums
 Reimut van Bonn – ambience

Additional musicians
 Peter Dolving – vocals on "Built Without Hands"

Production
 Stefan Wibbeke – layout, design
 Long Distance Calling – layout design

References

2007 albums
Long Distance Calling (band) albums